AlasNoAxis is the debut album by drummer Jim Black's AlasNoAxis featuring clarinetist/saxophonist Chris Speed, guitarist Hilmar Jensson and bassist Skúli Sverrisson recorded in 2000 and released on the Winter & Winter label.

Reception

In his review for Allmusic, Dave Lynch said "Alasnoaxis is a great debut for Black, although those who prefer their jazz unsullied by elements of the indie, prog, and avant rock worlds may be a bit put off". In JazzTimes, Bill Shoemaker observed "the album is something of the sonic equivalent of a tapas bar: lots of strong flavors served up in small portions, with plenty of spirits to clear the palette between tastes".

Track listing
All compositions by Jim Black
 "M m" - 2:38
 "Optical" - 5:04
 "Maybe" - 4:09
 "Ambacharm" - 6:31
 "Garden Frequency" - 3:09
 "Poet Staggered" - 1:11
 "Backfloatpedal" - 2:46
 "Icon" - 5:59
 "Luxuriate" -	6:52
 "Boombye" - 5:26
 "Auk and Dromedary" - 5:58
 "Trace" - 3:15
 "Nion" - 4:17
 "Melize" - 6:54
 "Angels and Artiface" - 1:37

Personnel
Jim Black - drums
Chris Speed - clarinet, tenor saxophone
Hilmar Jensson - electric guitar 
Skúli Sverrisson - electric bass

References

Winter & Winter Records albums
Jim Black albums
2000 debut albums